Mycobacterial porins are a group of transmembrane beta-barrel proteins produced by mycobacteria, which allow hydrophilic nutrients to enter the bacterium. They are  located in the impermeable mycobacterial outer membrane, or mycomembrane  of fast-growing mycobacteria. The mycomembrane is unique and  composed of very-long chain fatty acids, mycolic acids. These proteins are structurally different from the typical porins located in the outer membrane of Gram-negative bacteria. For example, the MspA protein forms a tightly interconnected octamer with eight-fold rotation symmetry that resembles a goblet and contains a central channel. Each protein subunit contains a beta-sandwich of immunoglobulin-like topology and a beta-ribbon arm that forms an oligomeric transmembrane beta-barrel.

MspA has biotechnological applications, most notably in nanopore sequencing.

References

Protein domains
Outer membrane proteins